1884 was the 98th season of cricket in England since the foundation of Marylebone Cricket Club (MCC). Australia toured England to compete for the Ashes. It was the seventh test series between the two sides. Fred Spofforth, an overseas bowler, took the most wickets, but England avenged its loss to the touring Australians in 1882 winning 1 test to 0.

Ashes tour

Champion County

 Nottinghamshire

Playing record (by county)

Derbyshire's ignominy of losing every game has been repeated since in county cricket only by the same club in 1920.

Leading batsmen (qualification 20 innings)

Leading bowlers (qualification 1,000 balls)

Notable events
 31 July and 1 August: Alfred Shaw achieved the notable feat of doing the hat-trick in each innings against Gloucestershire.

Notes
An unofficial seasonal title sometimes proclaimed by consensus of media and historians prior to December 1889 when the official County Championship was constituted.  Although there are ante-dated claims prior to 1873, when residence qualifications were introduced, it is only since that ruling that any quasi-official status can be ascribed.
The match between Lancashire and Gloucestershire scheduled for 24 to 26 July was abandoned on the announcement of the death of Mrs Grace, mother of WG and EM Grace. It is shown as a draw.

References

Annual reviews
 John Lillywhite’s Cricketer’s Companion (Green Lilly), Lillywhite, 1885
 James Lillywhite’s Cricketers’ Annual (Red Lilly), Lillywhite, 1885
 John Wisden's Cricketers' Almanack 1885

External links
 CricketArchive – season summaries

1884 in English cricket
English cricket seasons in the 19th century